Scott Martinez is a lawyer and former Denver City Attorney. He grew up in Lakewood, a suburb of Denver, Colorado. He graduated from the University of Colorado with a bachelor's degree in International Affairs and received his JD from University of San Diego - School of Law.

Martinez worked as a litigator at the firm Holland & Hart in Denver prior to working for the city attorney's office. He was an advisor to the Clinton-Kaine presidential election campaign and worked in the office of the White House counsel for the Obama-Biden transition. Martinez returned to Denver and led the state's Democratic Party in their redistricting and reapportionment efforts that were later upheld by the Colorado Supreme Court. In early 2012, he was appointed as Chief Deputy City Attorney by Denver Mayor Michael B. Hancock. In 2013 he was promoted to lead Denver City Attorney by Hancock, replacing Doug Friednash, who eventually became Colorado Governor John Hickenlooper’s chief of staff. At age 34, Martinez was the youngest to ever serve as lead attorney in the city's history.

In 2014, while working in the city attorney's office, Martinez was named National Latino Lawyer of the Year by the Hispanic National Bar Association. In February 2017, Martinez became a partner at Snell & Wilmer law office where he oversaw the Government Relations, Regulatory and Administrative Law division in the Denver office. As of 2021, he is a partner at Marvera Partners LLP, a consulting firm, and the owner of Martinez and Partners, LLC, a boutique government and business services law firm.

References 

Year of birth missing (living people)
Living people
Lawyers from Denver
University of Colorado alumni
University of San Diego School of Law alumni
Colorado city attorneys
Hispanic and Latino American lawyers
21st-century American lawyers
https://www.cbsnews.com/colorado/news/scott-martinez-steps-down-as-city-attorney/